The 2022–23 season was the 72nd season in the history of Ferencvárosi TC and their 6th consecutive season in the top flight. The club will participate in Nemzeti Bajnokság I, Magyar Kupa and the EHF European League.

Players

Squad information
Squad for the 2022–23 season. 

Goalkeepers
 24  Ádám Borbély
 67  Kristóf Győri
Left Wingers
 29  Ádám Juhász
 39  Sándor Bohács
 99  Péter Kovacsics
Right Wingers
 18  Bence Imre
 94  Bendegúz Bujdosó
Line Players 
2  Félix Turák
9  Dániel Füzi
 22  Bálint Pordán (c)
 23  Dávid Debreczeni

Left Backs
 11  Bence Nagy
 44  Viktor Prainer
 81  Jakub Mikita
Central Backs
7  Alex Bognár
 30  Ádám Török 
 66  Máté Lékai
 77  Kristóf Csörgő
Right Backs
 17  Máté Ónodi-Jánoskúti
 19  Zsolt Balogh

Transfers
Source: Rajt a K&H férfi ligában

 IN
  Zsolt Balogh (from  Tatabánya)
  Ádám Borbély (from  Veszprém KKFT)
  Kristóf Csörgő (from  Mezőkövesd)
  Máté Lékai (from  Veszprém)
  Ádám Török (from  Dabas)
 Head coach:  István Pásztor

 OUT
  Božo Anđelić (to  Vardar 1961)
  Xavér Deményi (to  NEKA)
  Miklós Karai (loan to  NEKA)
  Péter Kende (to  Cegléd)
  Szabolcs Tóth (to  Budakalász)
  Márk Vári (to  Balatonfüred)
  Marián Žernovič (to  TSV St. Otmar St. Gallen)
 Head coach:  Attila Horváth

Staff members
Source: Staff - Szakmai stáb Ferencvárosi TC / 2022-2023

 Head Coach: István Pásztor
 Goalkeeping Coach: Zsolt Ocsovai
 Fitness Coach: Ábel Nagy
 Physiotherapist: Dorottya Zsemberi
 Club Doctor: Balázs Sárdy MD
 Masseur: Máté Varga

Club

Management
Source: Staff - Szakmai stáb Ferencvárosi TC / 2022-2023

Uniform
Supplier: Nike
Shirt sponsor (front): Lidl / tippmix
Shirt sponsor (back): Pátria Nyomda / Diagnosticum Zrt.
Shirt sponsor (sleeves): MVM
Shorts sponsor: Lidl / MVM

Competitions
Times up to 30 October 2022 and from 26 March 2023 are CEST (UTC+2). Times from 30 October 2022 to 26 March 2023 are CET (UTC+1).

Overview

Nemzeti Bajnokság I

Regular season

Results by round

Matches
The league fixtures were announced on 5 July 2022.

Results overview

Magyar Kupa

Ferencváros entered the tournament in the fourth round.

EHF European League

First qualifying round
The draw was held on 19 July 2022 in Vienna.

Ferencvárosi TC won 74–49 on aggregate.

Second qualifying round
The draw was held on 6 September 2022 in Vienna.

Ferencvárosi TC won 66–64 on aggregate.

Group stage

The draw was held on 6 October 2022 in Vienna, Austria.

Results overview

Statistics

Top scorers
Includes all competitive matches. The list is sorted by shirt number when total goals are equal. Last updated on 5 September 2022.

References

External links
 
 Ferencvárosi TC at eurohandball.com

 
Ferencvárosi TC Men's